The 2019–20 Spartak Moscow season was the twenty-eighth successive season that the club played in the Russian Premier League, the highest tier of association football in Russia.

Season events
On 29 September, Oleg Kononov resigned as manager with Serhiy Kuznetsov being appointed as Caretaker manager. On 14 October, Domenico Tedesco was appointed as the new head coach on a contract until June 2021.

On 17 March, the Russian Premier League postponed all league fixtures until 10 April due to the COVID-19 pandemic.

On 1 April, the Russian Football Union extended the suspension of football until 31 May.

On 15 May, the Russian Football Union announced that the Russian Premier League season would resume on 21 June.

On 18 May, Spartak Moscow announced that they had exercised their option to purchase Aleksandr Sobolev from Krylia Sovetov.

On 25 June, Spartak Moscow signed a new contracts with Pavel Maslov and Ilya Golosov until the summer of 2024.

Squad

Out on loan

Left club during season

Transfers

In

Loans in

Out

Loans out

Released

Friendlies

Competitions

Russian Premier League

Results by round

Results

League table

Russian Cup

UEFA Europa League

Qualifying rounds

Squad statistics

Appearances and goals

|-
|colspan="14"|Players away from the club on loan:

|-
|colspan="14"|Players who left Spartak Moscow during the season:

|}

Goal scorers

Clean sheets

Disciplinary record

References

External links

FC Spartak Moscow seasons
Spartak Moscow
Spartak Moscow